Sing Again with The Chipmunks is Alvin and the Chipmunks' second album, released by Liberty Records in January 1960. The album follows the same format as their first album, and contains the group's fifth and sixth singles—"Alvin's Orchestra" and "Comin' 'Round the Mountain". Since its initial release, Sing Again with The Chipmunks has appeared twice on CD; both releases utilized the revised 1961 cover artwork, minus the song lyrics printed on the original back cover.

Commercial performance

Artwork
As with the debut album, the original issue depicted three realistic looking chipmunks on the cover sharing space with a photo of Ross Bagdasarian. When the album was reissued one year later, a new cover was substituted, that of an Alvin Show animation cel setup reenacting the poses the original chipmunks and Seville made.

Notes
This album has Alvin's first songwriting credit.

Track listing

Side one
"Sing Again with the Chipmunks" (Ross Bagdasarian, Sr.) – 0:53
"Comin' 'Round the Mountain" (Traditional, arr. Ross Bagdasarian, Sr.) – 2:14
"Home on the Range" (Brewster Higley and Daniel Kelley) – 2:53
"I Wish I Had a Horse" (Ross Bagdasarian Sr., Mark McIntyre) – 2:04
"Swanee River" (Stephen Foster) – 1:49
"When Johnny Comes Marching Home" (Patrick Sarsfield Gilmore) – 1:35

Side two
"Sing a Goofy Song" (Ross Bagdasarian Sr.) – 2:32
"Swing Low, Sweet Chariot" (Harry Thacker Burleigh) – 2:02
"Witch Doctor" (Ross Bagdasarian Sr.) — ("group" version) – 2:04
"Working on the Railroad" (Bill Balsham, var. Benny Goodman) – 1:56
"Row, Row, Row Your Boat" (Traditional, arr. by E. O. Lyte, Ross Bagdasarian Sr.) – 1:38
"Alvin’s Orchestra" (Ross Bagdasarian Sr.) – 3:01

All songs except "Sing Again with the Chipmunks" were adapted as a musical segment for The Alvin Show in 1961.

Source: Answers.com CD Universe

Personnel
 David Seville – keyboards, conduction and commentary
 Alvin Chipmunk – lead vocals, guitars, and harmonica
 Simon Chipmunk – guitars, bass and background vocals
 Theodore Chipmunk – drums and background vocals

Production
 Ross Bagdasarian – Producer
 Ted Keep – Engineer
 Pate/Francis & Assoc. – cover design and actual artwork – [original pressing]
 Studio Five – animation artwork – [reissue pressing]

References

1960 albums
Alvin and the Chipmunks albums
Liberty Records albums
Albums produced by Ross Bagdasarian